Johanna Bennett (born 30 September 1984) is an English musician. She was the frontwoman of the band Totalizer, whose demos were produced by Dirty Pretty Things guitarist Anthony Rossomando. The band played a couple of shows and folded in November 2007.

Bennett co-wrote the Arctic Monkeys single "Fluorescent Adolescent" with her then-boyfriend Alex Turner. The song lyrics were developed during a word game while the couple were on holiday.

Personal life
Bennett earned a psychology degree at Goldsmiths, University of London.

Bennett married Kings of Leon lead guitarist Matthew Followill in 2009; they live in Nashville, Tennessee with their sons, born in April 2011. and March 2013. Their third child, a girl, was born in July 2021.

References

1984 births
Alumni of Goldsmiths, University of London
British expatriates in the United States
Living people
People from Peterborough
Musicians from Cambridgeshire
21st-century British women  singers